Hindy is a surname. Notable people with the surname include:

Aly Hindy, Egyptian-born imam in Canada
Iván Hindy (1890–1946), Hungarian army officer